Ewing "Big Boy" Russell (April 22, 1906 – August 2, 1978) was an American  Negro league third baseman who played in the 1930s.

Russell played for the Cincinnati Tigers in 1936. In seven recorded games, he posted four hits in 21 plate appearances.

References

External links
Baseball statistics and player information from Baseball-Reference Black Baseball Stats and Seamheads

1906 births
1978 deaths

Place of birth missing
Cincinnati Tigers players
Baseball third basemen